Genny Caterina Pagliaro (born 15 October 1988) is an Italian weightlifter.

Genny is the sister of the other Italian weightlifting champion Alessandra Pagliaro.

Biography
She won four bronze medals for the 48 kg division at the European Weightlifting Championships (2006, 2007, 2009, and 2011). Pagliaro is a member of the weightlifting team for Centro Sportivo Esercito, and is coached and trained by Giuseppe Minissale.

Pagliaro represented Italy at the 2008 Summer Olympics in Beijing, where she competed for the women's flyweight category (48 kg). Pagliaro, however, did not finish the event, after failing to lift a single-motion snatch of 82 kg in three attempts.

References

External links
 
 
 
 

1988 births
Living people
Olympic weightlifters of Italy
Weightlifters at the 2008 Summer Olympics
People from Rovereto
Italian female weightlifters
Mediterranean Games gold medalists for Italy
Mediterranean Games silver medalists for Italy
Mediterranean Games medalists in weightlifting
Competitors at the 2005 Mediterranean Games
European Weightlifting Championships medalists
20th-century Italian women
21st-century Italian women